The 1995 Italian Grand Prix (formally the Pioneer 66º Gran Premio d'Italia) was a Formula One motor race held on 10 September 1995 at the Autodromo Nazionale di Monza, Monza, Italy. It was the twelfth race of the 1995 Formula One World Championship.

The 53-lap race was won by British driver Johnny Herbert, driving a Benetton-Renault, after starting from eighth position. Finn Mika Häkkinen was second in a McLaren-Mercedes, with German Heinz-Harald Frentzen third in a Sauber-Ford, achieving both his and the Sauber team's first F1 podium finish.

Report
Pole-sitter David Coulthard spun off on the formation lap exiting the Ascari chicane, and retired in the pitlane as the grid formed for the start. However, the race was stopped after a first lap collision at the same spot (on dust he had dragged onto the corner when attempting to rejoin) involving Max Papis, Jean-Christophe Boullion, Roberto Moreno, and Andrea Montermini, resulting in a blocked track. Coulthard was able to take the restart from pole again (in a spare car set up for Damon Hill), whilst Moreno and Montermini failed to take the restart due to a lack of spare cars.  Coulthard led until his wheel bearing failed, leaving Gerhard Berger in the lead. Behind, Hill and Michael Schumacher had their second major collision of the season; the previous one having happened at the British Grand Prix. As Hill attempted to lap Taki Inoue's Footwork, Hill crashed into the back of Schumacher when braking for the second chicane, causing both to retire. Schumacher ran over to the Williams to confront Hill whilst the British driver sat in his cockpit, but was immediately pulled away by marshals. Schumacher later apologised to Hill when Inoue admitted the incident was his fault, as he had slid in front of Hill while being passed by Schumacher, causing Hill to take evasive action and inadvertently run into the back of Schumacher's car. Hill was subsequently given a one race suspended ban for his part in the collision.

After the pitstops the Ferraris were running first and second. Berger suffered a bizarre retirement when a TV camera on Jean Alesi's rear wing flew off and destroyed Berger's suspension. Alesi looked set to win his second Grand Prix but subsequently retired with a wheel bearing failure with just 8 laps to go. Alesi had also retired from the lead the previous year. This succession of retirements handed a second victory to Johnny Herbert, and then best-ever results to Mika Häkkinen and Heinz-Harald Frentzen - the first podium finish for the Sauber team in F1. Papis was on course for his first points finish, until he was overtaken by Boullion on the final lap.

Classification

Qualifying

Race 

Notes
 – Montermini and Moreno started the original race but were involved in the first lap collision that resulted in a red flag. They did not take the restart and are omitted in the official results indicating they are credited as "Did not start"

Championship standings after the race

Drivers' Championship standings

Constructors' Championship standings

References 

Italian Grand Prix
Italian Grand Prix
Italian Grand Prix
Italian Grand Prix